Piedmont is a small unincorporated community in Clallam County, Washington, United States.  It is located on Lake Crescent in the northwestern corner of the Olympic National Park.

Settler John Smith arrived at the Piedmont area around 1883.  William Dawson named Piedmont in 1893 for its location at the foot of a mountain.

References

External links 
Piedmont, Clallam County, Washington

Unincorporated communities in Washington (state)
Unincorporated communities in Clallam County, Washington